Ichikawa-FM was a Japanese local FM radio station (Community FM) in Ichikawa, Japan.

External links
 Official website

Defunct radio stations in Japan
Radio in Japan
Mass media in Ichikawa, Chiba
Radio stations established in 1998
Radio stations disestablished in 2017